George Anderson (24 November 1886 – 12 June 1976) was an Australian rules footballer, playing with South Melbourne and University in the Victorian Football League (VFL).

He started his career with South Melbourne, playing for three seasons before playing with University after missing several seasons. Anderson played most of his career as a backman, where he only managed to kick one goal in his 62 matches. He ended his career when University withdrew from the VFL. After his football career, Anderson became a missionary in Korea.

Footnotes

References

1886 births
1976 deaths
University Football Club players
Sydney Swans players
Leopold Football Club (MJFA) players
Horsham Football Club players
Australian rules footballers from Melbourne
Australian expatriates in Korea